Count (feminine: countess) is a historical title of nobility in certain European countries, varying in relative status, generally of middling rank in the hierarchy of nobility. Especially in earlier medieval periods the term often implied not only a certain status, but also that the count had specific responsibilities or offices. The etymologically related English term "county" denoted the territories associated with some countships, but not all. 

Although the term count was not generally used in England, after the 1066 conquest by the Normans, the European term "count" was the normal translation used for the English title of "earl", and the wives of earls are still referred to as countesses.

Definition

The word count came into English from the French comte, itself from Latin comes—in its accusative comitem—meaning “companion”, and later “companion of the emperor, delegate of the emperor”. 

In the late Roman Empire, the Latin title comes denoted the high rank of various courtiers and provincial officials, either military or administrative. Before Anthemius became emperor in the West in 467, he was a military comes charged with strengthening defenses on the Danube frontier.

In the Western Roman Empire, "count" came to indicate generically a military commander but was not a specific rank. In the Eastern Roman Empire, from about the seventh century, "count" was a specific rank indicating the commander of two centuriae (i.e., 200 men).

Military counts in the Late Empire and the Germanic successor kingdoms were often appointed by a dux and later by a king. From the start the count was not in charge of a roving warband, but settled in a locality, known as a county; his main rival for power was the bishop, whose diocese was sometimes coterminous with the county.

In the Frankish kingdoms in the early Middle Ages, a count might also be a count palatine, whose authority derived directly from the royal household, the palace in its original sense of the seat of power and administration. This other kind of count had vague antecedents in Late Antiquity too: the father of Cassiodorus held positions of trust with Theodoric, as comes rerum privatarum, in charge of the imperial lands, then as comes sacrarum largitionum ("count of the sacred doles"), concerned with the finances of the realm.

The position of comes was originally not hereditary. The position of count was regarded as an administrative official dependent on the king, until the process of allodialisation during the 9th century in which it became private possessions of noble families. By virtue of their large estates, many counts could pass the title to their heirs—but not always. For instance, in Piast Poland, the position of komes was not hereditary, resembling the early Merovingian institution. The title had disappeared by the era of the Polish–Lithuanian Commonwealth, and the office had been replaced by others. Only after the Partitions of Poland did the title of "count" resurface in the title hrabia, derived from the German Graf.

Land attached to title

Originally, with the emergence of the title came the most powerful symbol of entitlement, that is the ownership of and jurisdiction over land, hence the term county. The term is derived from the Old French conté or cunté denoting a jurisdiction under the control of a count (earl) or a viscount. The modern French is comté, and its equivalents in other languages are contea, contado, comtat, condado, Grafschaft, graafschap, etc. (cf. conte, comte, conde, Graf).

The title of Count was also often conferred by the monarch as an honorific title for special services rendered, without a feudal estate (countship, county) being attached, so it was merely a title, with or without a domain name attached to it. In the United Kingdom, the equivalent "Earl" can also be used as a courtesy title for the eldest son of a duke or marquess. In the Italian states, by contrast, all the sons of certain counts were little counts (contini). In Sweden there is a distinction between counts (Swedish: greve) created before and after 1809. All children in comital families elevated before 1809 were called count/countess. In families elevated after 1809, only the head of the family was called count, the rest have a status similar to barons and were called by the equivalent of "Mr/Ms/Mrs", before the recognition of titles of nobility was abolished.

Comital titles in different European languages
The following lists are originally based on a Glossary on Heraldica.org by Alexander Krischnig. The male form is followed by the female, and when available, by the territorial circumscription.

Etymological derivations from the Latin

Etymological derivations from German  and/or Dutch

Compound and related titles
Apart from all these, a few unusual titles have been of comital rank, not necessarily permanently.
  (English: Dolphin; ; ;) was a multiple (though rare) comital title in southern France, used by the Dauphins of Vienne and Auvergne, before 1349 when it became the title of the heir to the French throne.
  "Count-Duke" is a rare title used in Spain, notably by Gaspar de Guzmán, Count-Duke of Olivares. He had inherited the title of count of Olivares, but when created Duke of Sanlucar la Mayor by King Philip IV of Spain he begged permission to preserve his inherited title in combination with the new honour—according to a practice almost unique in Spanish history; logically the incumbent ranks as Duke (higher than Count) just as he would when simply concatenating both titles.
  'Count-Baron' is a rare title used in Portugal, notably by Dom , 7th Baron of Alvito, who received the title of Count of Oriola in 1653 from King John IV of Portugal. His palace in Lisbon still exists, located in a square named after him.
 Archcount is a very rare title, etymologically analogous to archduke, apparently never recognized officially, used by or for:
 the count of Flanders (an original  of the French realm in present Belgium, very rich, once expected to be raised to the rank of kingdom); the informal, rather descriptive use on account of the countship's de facto importance is rather analogous to the unofficial epithet  (before Grand duke became a formal title) for the even wealthier Duke of Burgundy
 at least one Count of Burgundy (i.e.  of )
 The German  and Dutch  stem from the Byzantine-Greek   meaning "he who calls a meeting [i.e. the court] together").

Lists of countships

Territory of today's France

Kingdom of the Western Franks
Since Louis VII (1137–80), the highest precedence amongst the vassals (Prince-bishops and secular nobility) of the French crown was enjoyed by those whose benefice or temporal fief was a pairie, i.e. carried the exclusive rank of pair; within the first (i.e. clerical) and second (noble) estates, the first three of the original twelve anciennes pairies were ducal, the next three comital comté-pairies:
 Bishop-counts of Beauvais (in Picardy)
 Bishop-counts of Châlons (in Champagne)
 Bishop-counts of Noyon (in Picardy)
 Count of Toulouse, until united to the crown in 1271 by marriage
 Count of Flanders (Flandres in French), which is in the Low countries and was confiscated in 1299, though returned in 1303
 Count of Champagne, until united to the crown (in 1316 by marriage, conclusively in 1361)
Later other countships (and duchies, even baronies) have been raised to this French peerage, but mostly as apanages (for members of the royal house) or for foreigners; after the 16th century all new peerages were always duchies and the medieval countship-peerages had died out, or were held by royal princes

Other French countships of note included those of:
 Count of Angoulême, later Duke
 Count of Anjou, later Duke
 Count of Auvergne
 Count of Bar, later Duke
 Count of Blois
 Count of Boulogne
 Count of Foix
 Count of Montpensier
 Count of Poitiers

Parts of today's France long within other kingdoms of the Holy Roman Empire
 Freigraf ("free count") of Burgundy (i.e. present Franche-Comté)
 The Dauphiné

The Holy Roman Empire
See also above for parts of present France

In Germany

A Graf ruled over a territory known as a Grafschaft ('county'). See also various comital and related titles; especially those actually reigning over a principality: Gefürsteter Graf, Landgraf, Reichsgraf; compare Markgraf, Burggraf, Pfalzgraf (see Imperial quaternions).

Northern Italian states
The title of Conte is very prolific on the peninsula. In the eleventh century, Conti like the Count of Savoy or the Norman Count of Apulia, were virtually sovereign lords of broad territories. Even apparently "lower"-sounding titles, like Viscount, could describe powerful dynasts, such as the House of Visconti which ruled a major city such as Milan. The essential title of a feudatory, introduced by the Normans, was signore, modeled on the French seigneur, used with the name of the fief. By the fourteenth century, conte and the Imperial title barone were virtually synonymous.

Some titles of a count, according to the particulars of the patent, might be inherited by the eldest son of a Count. Younger brothers might be distinguished as "X dei conti di Y" ("X of the counts of Y"). However, if there is no male to inherit the title and the count has a daughter, in some regions she could inherit the title.

Many Italian counts left their mark on Italian history as individuals, yet only a few contadi (countships; the word contadini for inhabitants of a "county" remains the Italian word for "peasant") were politically significant principalities, notably:
 Norman Count of Apulia
 Count of Savoy, later Duke (also partly in France and in Switzerland)
 Count of Asti
 Count of Montferrat (Monferrato)
 Count of Montefeltro
 Count of Tusculum

In Austria
The principalities tended to start out as margraviate or (promoted to) duchy, and became nominal archduchies within the Habsburg dynasty; noteworthy are:
 Count of Tyrol
 Count of Cilli
 Count of Schaumburg

In the Low Countries 
Apart from various small ones, significant were :
 in present Belgium :
 Count of Flanders (Vlaanderen in Dutch), but only the small part east of the river Schelde remained within the empire; the far larger west, an original French comté-pairie became part of the French realm
 Count of Hainaut
 Count of Namur, later a margraviate
 Count of Leuven (Louvain) soon became the Duke of Brabant
 Count of Mechelen, though the Heerlijkheid Mechelen was given the title of "Graafschap" in 1490, the city was rarely referred to as a county and the title of Count has not been in practical use by or for anyone of the series of persons that became rightfully entitled to it; the flag and weapon of the municipality still has the corresponding heraldic crowned single-headed eagle of sabre on gold.
 in the present Netherlands:
 Count of Guelders later Dukes of Guelders
 Count of Holland
 Count of Zeeland
 Count of Zutphen

In Switzerland 

 Count of Geneva
 Count of Neuchâtel
 Count of Toggenburg
 Count of Kyburg
 Count de Salis-Soglio (also in the UK, Canada and Australia)
 Count de Salis-Seewis
 Count of Panzutti
Count In-Albon

In other continental European countries

Holy See 

Count/Countess was one of the noble titles granted by the Pope as a temporal sovereign, and the title's holder was sometimes informally known as a papal count/papal countess or less so as a Roman count/Roman countess, but mostly as count/countess. The comital title, which could be for life or hereditary, was awarded in various forms by popes and Holy Roman Emperors since the Middle Ages, infrequently before the 14th century, and the pope continued to grant the comital and other noble titles even after 1870, it was largely discontinued in the mid 20th-century, on the accession of John XXIII. The Papacy and the Kingdom of the Two Sicilies might appoint counts palatine with no particular territorial fief. Until 1812 in some regions, the purchaser of land designated "feudal" was ennobled by the noble seat that he held and became a conte. This practice ceased with the formal abolition of feudalism in the various principalities of early-19th century Italy, last of all in the Papal States.

In Poland 

Poland was notable throughout its history for not granting titles of nobility. This was on the premise that one could only be born into nobility, outside rare exceptions. Instead, it conferred non-hereditary courtly or civic roles. The noble titles that were in use on its territory were mostly of foreign provenance and usually subject to the process of indygenat, naturalisation.

In Hungary 

Somewhat similar to the native privileged class of nobles found in Poland, Hungary also had a class of Conditional nobles.

On the Iberian peninsula

As opposed to the plethora of hollow "gentry" counts, only a few countships ever were important in medieval Iberia; most territory was firmly within the Reconquista kingdoms before counts could become important. However, during the 19th century, the title, having lost its high rank (equivalent to that of Duke), proliferated.

Portugal
Portugal itself started as a countship in 868, but became a kingdom in 1139 (see:County of Portugal). Throughout the History of Portugal, especially during the Constitutional Monarchy many other countships were created (see: List of Countships in Portugal).

Spain

In Spain, no countships of wider importance exist, except in the former Spanish march.
County of Barcelona, the initial core of the Principality of Catalonia, later one of the states of the Crown of Aragon, which became one of the two main components of the Spanish crown.
Count of Aragon
Count of Castile
Count of Galicia
Count of Lara
Count Cassius, progenitor of the Banu Qasi
County of Urgell, later integrated into the Principality of Catalonia.
The other Catalan counties were much smaller and were absorbed early into the County of Barcelona (between parentheses the annexation year): County of Girona (897), County of Besalú, County of Osona, which included the nominal County of Manresa (1111), County of Berga and County of Conflent (1117) and County of Cerdanya (1118). From 1162 these counties, together with that of Barcelona, were merged into the Principality of Catalonia, a sovereign state that absorbed some other counties: County of Roussillon (1172), County of Pallars Jussà (1192), County of Empúries (1402), County of Urgell (1413) and County of Pallars Sobirà (1487), giving the Principality its definitive shape.

South Eastern Europe

Bulgaria
In the First Bulgarian Empire, a komit was a hereditary provincial ruler under the tsar documented since the reign of Presian (836-852) The Cometopouli dynasty was named after its founder, the komit of Sredets.

Montenegro and Serbia
The title of Serdar was used in the Principality of Montenegro and the Principality of Serbia as a noble title below that of Voivode equivalent to that of Count.

Crusader states 
 Count of Edessa
 Count of Tripoli (1102–1288)

Scandinavia 

In Denmark and historically in Denmark-Norway the title of count (greve) is the highest rank of nobility used in the modern period. Some Danish/Dano-Norwegian countships were associated with fiefs, and these counts were known as "feudal counts" (lensgreve). They rank above ordinary (titular) counts, and their position in the Danish aristocracy as the highest-ranking noblemen is broadly comparable to that of dukes in other European countries. With the first free Constitution of Denmark of 1849 came a complete abolition of the privileges of the nobility. Since then the title of count has been granted only to members of the Danish royal family, either as a replacement for a princely title when marrying a commoner, or in recent times, instead of that title in connection with divorce. Thus the first wife of Prince Joachim of Denmark, the younger son of Margrethe II of Denmark, became Alexandra, Countess of Frederiksborg on their divorce - initially retaining her title of princess, but losing it on her remarriage.

In the Middle Ages the title of jarl (earl) was the highest title of nobility. The title was eventually replaced by the title of duke, but that title was abolished in Denmark and Norway as early as the Middle Ages. Titles were only reintroduced with the introduction of absolute monarchy in 1660, with count as the highest title.

In Sweden the rank of count is the highest rank conferred upon nobles in the modern era and are, like their Danish and Norwegian counterparts, broadly comparable to that of dukes in other European countries. Unlike the rest of Scandinavia, the title of duke is still used in Sweden, but only by members of the royal family and are not considered part of the nobility.

Equivalents
Like other major Western noble titles, Count is sometimes used to render certain titles in non-western languages with their own traditions, even though they are as a rule historically unrelated and thus hard to compare, but which are considered "equivalent" in rank.

This is the case with:

the Chinese Bó (伯), hereditary title of nobility ranking below Hóu (侯) and above Zĭ (子)
the Japanese equivalent Hakushaku, adapted during the Meiji restoration
the Korean equivalent Baekjak (백작) or Poguk
 in Vietnam, it is rendered Bá, one of the lower titles reserved for male members of the Imperial clan, above Tử (Viscount), Nam (Baron) and Vinh phong (lowest noble title), but lower than—in ascending order—Hầu (Marquis), Công (Prince), Quận-Công (Duke/Duke of a commandery) and Quốc-Công (Grand Duke/Duke of the Nation), all under Vương (King) and Hoàng Đế (Emperor).
the Indian Sardar, adopted by the Maratha Empire, additionally, Jagirdar and Deshmukh are close equivalents
the Arabic equivalent Sheikh
In traditional Sulu equivalent to Datu Sadja

In fiction 

The title "Count" in fiction is commonly given to evil characters or vampires:

Count Nefaria
Count Vertigo
The Count (Sesame Street)
Count Duckula
Count Olaf
Count Chocula
Count Paris
Count of Monte Cristo
Count Dooku
Count Dracula
Count Orlok

See also
 Czech nobility
 Icelandic nobility
 Romanian nobility
 Russian nobility
 Viscount
 Earl

References

Sources 
 Labarre de Raillicourt: Les Comtes Romains
 Westermann, Großer Atlas zur Weltgeschichte (in German)

External links 

 Heraldica.org - here the French peerage
 Italian Titles of Nobility
 Webster's 1828 Dictionary

 
Feudalism
Roman Empire in late antiquity
Noble titles
Titles
Men's social titles

de:Graf